Street Magic TV was a British magic program featuring magician Matt Grindley on Channel 4

First airing in January 2006, the program ran for six episodes. In 2007, the show returned with Grindley as a one-time special on MTV UK.

External links
 The official site of Matt Grindley

British television magic series
2006 British television series debuts
2007 British television series endings